Malinauskas government may refer to:

The history of the South Australian Government under Labor Premier Peter Malinauskas
Malinauskas ministry, the members of the ministry under Premier Peter Malinauskas